The 2019 Big West Conference women's basketball tournament was the postseason women's basketball tournament that took place March 12–16, 2019, at two venues in the Los Angeles area. The first two rounds were scheduled for the Bren Events Center in Irvine, California, while the semifinals and championship were held at the Honda Center in Anaheim. The winner of the Big West tournament receives the conference's automatic bid to the 2019 NCAA Women's Division I Basketball Tournament. UC Davis won the conference tournament championship game over Hawai'i, 58–50.

Seeds

Schedule

Bracket

See also
 2019 Big West Conference men's basketball tournament

References

External links
2019 Big West Women's Basketball Championship 

Big West Conference women's basketball tournament
2018–19 Big West Conference women's basketball season